At the 1934 British Empire Games, the athletics events were held at the White City Stadium in London, England in August 1934. A total of 30 athletics events were contested at the Games, 21 by men and 9 by women.

Medal summary

Men

Women

(*) Edith Halstead was later sexually reassigned and took the name Edwin "Eddie" Halstead, brother of Nellie Halstead.

Medal table

Participating nations

 (7)
 (6)
 (1)
 (47)
 (89)
 (5)
 (3)
 (3)
 (3)
 (6)
 (25)
 (11)
 (6)
 (1)
 (10)

References

Results
 Commonwealth Games Medallists - Men. GBR Athletics. Retrieved on 2010-09-02.
 Commonwealth Games Medallists - Women. GBR Athletics. Retrieved on 2010-09-02.

External links
 Athletics video highlights of 1934 Empire Games from British Pathé

1934 British Empire Games events
1934
1934 British Empire Games
International athletics competitions hosted by England